Normand MacMillan (born December 14, 1947 in Buckingham, Quebec) is a Quebec politician, businessman and insurance agent. He was the MNA for the riding of Papineau in the Outaouais region between 1989 and 2012, representing the Quebec Liberal Party.  He was the government's Chief Whip from 2005 to 2012, and President of the Caucus Chair from 2003 to 2005.

Career
Prior to his political career, MacMillan worked as an insurance agent between 1969 and 1972. He was also the owner of a hotel from 1972 to 1983 and the co-owner of Nord MacMillan Inc. in 2003 which operates the same hotel business. He was also the Chair of the Economic Development Committee for the region and also a city councillor for the former city of Buckingham in the 1980s.

In addition, of being involved in the economic development of the Buckingham and La Lievre region, MacMillan was also involved in the community as he is a member of the Knights of Columbus Buckingham Division since 1968 and the member of the Lions Club since 1973. He also founded a Junior A hockey club, les Castors de Buckingham, in 1973.

MacMillan entered provincial politics as he was elected MNA for Papineau in a by-election in 1989 although he was a member of the Liberal Party since 1980. Since then he was re-elected in 1994, 1998, 2003 and 2007. After being briefly the president of the government's caucus, he was named the government's chief whip in 2005.

On December 7, 2007, MacMillan was diagnosed with prostate cancer after multiple tests and received treatment during the first quarter of 2008. He said that he had no plans to retire from politics.

Following his win in 2008, MacMillan was named the Delegate Minister for Transportation, an assistant position to the main minister Julie Boulet.

MacMillan is married and has two children.

He announced on July 11, 2012 that he would not run in the general election in September 2012.

MacMillan is also known for having called his political opponent Sylvie Roy "grosse crisse".

Electoral record (partial)

References

External links
 

Living people
Quebec Liberal Party MNAs
1947 births
Members of the Executive Council of Quebec
Politicians from Gatineau
Anglophone Quebec people
21st-century Canadian politicians